Glenkiln Sculpture Park was a sculpture landscape in the historic county of Kirkcudbrightshire in Dumfries and Galloway, south-west Scotland.

After one of the bronze statues was stolen all the statues except the Glenkiln Cross and reclining figures have been removed.

It comprised six sculptures placed in a moorland setting around Glenkiln Reservoir.

Between 1951 and 1976, local landowner Sir William "Tony" Keswick (grandson of William Keswick) assembled a collection of works by Auguste Rodin, Henry Moore, and Jacob Epstein. Keswick worked with the artists in siting their works in a natural landscape, and commissioned works.

On 13 October 2013, the BBC reported that Standing Figure had been stolen.

All the sculptures except "Glenkiln Cross" have been removed for security reasons on police advice and are no longer available to view.

The sculptures formerly on show are:

 Saint John the Baptist (1878) by Auguste Rodin
 Visitation (1926) by Jacob Epstein 
 Standing Figure (1950) by Henry Moore
 King and Queen (1952–53) by Henry Moore
 Upright Motive No. 1: Glenkiln Cross (1955–56) by Henry Moore 
 Two Piece Reclining Figure No.1 (1959) by Henry Moore
 
There is also a memorial to commemorate the diamond wedding of Sir William and Lady Keswick and another to Peter Fleming the travel writer and adventurer, friend of the Keswicks, who used to shoot on the estate.

Gallery

References

External links

 Glenkiln Estate, Henry Moore: Works in Public

Sculpture gardens, trails and parks in the United Kingdom
Parks in Dumfries and Galloway
Outdoor sculptures in Scotland
Art museums and galleries in Dumfries and Galloway
Bronze sculptures in Scotland
1951 establishments in Scotland
2013 disestablishments in Scotland